Tao-Njia is a studio album by American jazz trumpeter Wadada Leo Smith which was recorded in 1995 and released on the Tzadik Records' Composer Series.

Music
"Another Wave More Waves" is performed by Smith's ensemble N'Da Kulture. "Double Thunderbolt" is a composition in six movements created as a memorial for Don Cherry with poetry by Smith's wife, Harumi Makino Smith. On the title track, the trumpeter is backed by the California E.A.R. Unit, a chamber ensemble conducted by Stephen "Lucky" Mosko.

Reception

In her review for AllMusic, Joslyn Layne states "Incorporating personal philosophy and beliefs into his compositions through mood and accompanying texts, Smith creates a warm album of spiritual instrumental music."

The Penguin Guide to Jazz notes "Recent years have seen Smith personally and musically involved with Oriental culture, and this is strongly reflected in Tao-Njia. Acoustically, it is one of his most remarkable records, a rich montage of sounds that are at once new and immediately familiar."

The Down Beat review by John Corbett says "Tao Njia'''s three pieces are gentle, deceptively spacious compositions loaded with the gestural oomph of a master calligrapher. One might call them 'chamberish,' but that would be to miss their stylistic breadth, their Asian classical overtones and the force of Smith's soloing."

Track listingAll compositions by Wadada Leo Smith''
 "Another Wave More Waves" - 9:30
 "Double Thunderbolt: Memorial for Don Cherry" - 12:14
 "Tao-Njia" - 21:16

Personnel
Wadada Leo Smith - trumpet, flugelhorn, bamboo flute, nohkan, axatse, monophony-bar, Indian low bell, Japanese high bell, pre-recorded mbira
David Philipson - two low drums, frame drums, bansuri, axatse, Tibetan temple bells
Mika Noda - vibraphone, tubular bells, timpani
Harumi Makino Smith - poetry
Dorothy Stone - flute, alto flute, piccolo
Martin Walker - clarinet, bass clarinet
Vicki Ray - piano, celesta
Robin Lorentz - violin
Erika Duke - cello
Stephen Lucky Mosko - conductor

References

1996 albums
Wadada Leo Smith albums
Tzadik Records albums